Free the Nipple is a topfreedom campaign created in 2012 during pre-production of a 2014 film of the same name. The campaign highlights the general convention of allowing men to appear topless in public while considering it sexual or indecent for women to do the same, and asserts that this difference is an unjust treatment of women. The campaign argues that it should be legally and culturally acceptable for women to bare their nipples in public.

History
In 2012, filmmaker Lina Esco started this campaign in New York City. She created a documentary of herself running through the streets of New York topless. As the documentary was being made, she posted teaser clips with the hashtag #FreeTheNipple. In 2013, Facebook removed these clips from its website for violating its guidelines. In 2014, several celebrities such as Miley Cyrus, Lena Dunham, Chelsea Handler, Rihanna and Chrissy Teigen posted photos on social media to show their support of Esco's initiative.

Two protesters, Tiernan Hebron and UCSD graduate student Anni Ma 
were arrested for indecent exposure outside of a campaign appearance for Senator Bernie Sanders on March 23, 2016. They appeared topless except for pieces of tape over their nipples, and had the words "Free the Nipple", "Equality", and "Feel the Bern" written on their chests. Los Angeles Police officers asked them to cover their breasts, and the two women refused and were arrested. They were held for 25 hours in jail but were not charged with any crime. After being released, Ma filed a federal lawsuit against the Los Angeles Police Department. Ma said that her action was not lewd because mammary glands are not sexual organs, but rather have the purpose of breastfeeding children, and said she believed she did not at any point show her "genitals" or "private parts". Her attorney claims she was never "nude" and that California's indecent exposure law applies only to genitals, not breasts. Her lawsuit also alleged that her constitutional rights had been violated, that she had been subject to unlawful gender discrimination, and that federal civil rights laws had been violated. She was topless at a Bernie Sanders campaign rally, March 19, 2016, in Phoenix, Arizona, and she was led to the back of the venue without incident. On 23 January 2016, Anni Ma, as a FEMEN activist, Carly Mitchell, Chelsea Ducote and Marston protested at a "Walk For Life" event at the San Francisco City Hall and the Civic Center.

Historically, women have sometimes been arrested or charged with public indecency, disturbing the peace, or lewd behavior for baring their breasts in public, even in jurisdictions where there was no law explicitly prohibiting doing so. In New York state, female toplessness was made legal around 1990, and when a woman was arrested there in 2005 for appearing topless in public, a court ruled in her favor and she later received US$29,000 in damages.

In 2015, the campaign received attention in Iceland after a teenage student activist posted a photo of herself topless and was harassed for doing so. In support of the student and the initiative, Björt Ólafsdóttir, a Member of Parliament, posted a topless photo of herself in solidarity.

Free the Nipple events were held in Brighton, England, in 2016, 2017 and 2018. The Free the Nipple Brighton group is headed up by Bee Nicholls and Mickey F, both of Brighton.

In 2017 a Free The Nipple event was held in Hull, England, on the day also celebrated as Women's Equality Day and Go Topless Day, the anniversary of the Nineteenth Amendment to the United States Constitution in 1920 which gave US women the right to vote.

There was also a Free the Nipple event in 2017, held in Charleston, West Virginia.

Court cases 

Various court cases in the United States have involved the question of whether women may publicly expose female breasts. Two examples are Erie v. Pap's A. and Barnes v. Glen Theatre. These involved ordinances that placed restrictions on how women were legally permitted to appear in public, focusing on banning any public exposure of the female breasts. A lawsuit was filed as Free the Nipple v. City of Fort Collins, which was an attempt to remove the provision in the municipal code of Fort Collins, Colorado, that prohibits women from revealing their breasts. The federal lawsuit was won at the appellate level. In September 2019, after spending over $300,000, Fort Collins decided to stop defending their ordinance and repeal it. That effectively gave women of all ages the right to go topless wherever men can in the jurisdiction of the 10th Circuit (the states of Wyoming, Utah, Colorado, New Mexico, Kansas and Oklahoma, including all their cities).

There are two U.S. states where the mere showing of women's breasts is illegal: Indiana and Tennessee. Fourteen states and many other cities have laws with ambiguous implications on how much a woman is allowed to expose her body.

Social media campaign 
Every major social media platform has their own guideline and policy in regards to nudity and revealing nipples. Facebook only allows photos of nipples to be posted when it is "in the context of breastfeeding, birth giving and after-birth moments, health (for example, post-mastectomy, breast cancer awareness, or gender reassignment surgery), or an act of protest."

Instagram generally censors nipples on women’s bodies. Instagram's guideline for nudity states "We know that there are times when people might want to share nude images that are artistic or creative in nature, but for a variety of reasons, we don't allow nudity on Instagram. This includes photos, videos, and some digitally-created content that show sexual intercourse, genitals, and close-ups of fully-nude buttocks. It also includes some photos of female nipples, but photos of post-mastectomy scarring and women actively breastfeeding are allowed. Nudity in photos of paintings and sculptures is OK, too." This is an update from Instagram's historic community guidelines, which included the ambiguous phrase "keep your clothes on." Instagram's CEO Kevin Systrom said that because of the Apple's App Store regulations, every app needs an age rating. If an app contains nudity, it has to be rated 17+. The CEO would prefer Instagram remain at its current rating of 12+, to attract a younger audience.

Pinterest allows artistic and non-sexualized nudity. Their reasoning on why they allow nudity and mature content is for "art, safe sex education or advocacy for political protests".

Differing rules are applied by other social media and these change with time. In 2014, YouTube had no specific policy that barred nipples but the platform did not allow sexually explicit material. Google+ had a policy of not allowing nipples to be shown unless they were in cartoons. Flickr and Tumblr allowed users to control how much nudity they wanted to see, but when the filtering was switched off there were no restrictions. Twitter placed no restrictions on female nudity. In 2018, Tumblr changed its rules to ban "female-presenting nipples" and other nudity, though these restrictions that were relaxed in 2022. Google+ was shut down in 2019.

A tactic that activists have taken up is the use of the hashtag #FreeTheNipple. This tag has been used on Facebook, Instagram and Twitter, where it can be used for searching the databases for posts with the same tag.

Some celebrities have expressed support for the #FreeTheNipple movement on social media, including Miley Cyrus, Lena Dunham, Jennifer Aniston, Scout Willis, Rihanna, Cara Delevingne, and Naomi Campbell. Miley Cyrus said, "The nipple, what you can't show, is what everyone has. But the jug part that everybody doesn't, you're allowed to show underboob. I've never understood the way it works" on Jimmy Kimmel Live where she spoke about the campaign.

Film and television 

In 2014, director Lina Esco released her American feature film Free the Nipple. The film is centered around a group of young women who take to the streets of New York City as they protest the legal and cultural taboos regarding female breasts by way of publicity stunts, graffiti installations, and First Amendment lawyers. After shooting the film in 2012, Esco found it difficult to get the film widely released, motivating her to start the campaign in December 2013.

In episode 106 of The Bold Type, the main character, Kat, participates in the campaign on social media by going against Instagram's guidelines by posting pictures with male nipples pasted onto women's bodies. The character said that freeing the nipple is more than just about Instagram and more about equality.

See also

 Breastfeeding in public
 Clothing laws by country
 Go Topless Day

References

External links 
 Free the Nipple

Feminist organizations in the United States
Feminism in the United Kingdom
Third-wave feminism
Nudity in the United States
Nipple
Civil disobedience
Gender equality
Nudity and protest
Nudity
Women's rights in the United Kingdom
Women's rights in the United States